Dominika Stará (born 13 August 1993) is a Slovak pop singer who competed in the first season of the Česko Slovenská Superstar (Czech-Slovak Superstar), where she finished third, the most successful female participant in the competition.

References

External links 
 dominikastara.sk — Official website (in Slovak)

21st-century Slovak women singers
Czech television personalities
1993 births
Living people
Idols (TV series) winners
Pop Idol contestants
21st-century British women singers